Eskdalemuir  is a civil parish and small village in Dumfries and Galloway, Scotland, with a population of 265.

The area comprises high wet moorlands, chiefly used for sheep grazing and forestry plantation (Eskdalemuir Forest). The main settlement is near the White Esk river.

Eskdalemuir is probably best known for the Eskdalemuir Observatory and for the Samye Ling Tibetan Buddhist monastery.

Upper Eskdale Development Group
In 2006 the Upper Eskdale Development Group was formed with the aim to reconnect the local community, after the local pub, school, and post office closed, by the development of a Community Hub based in the former school building.  They have now transformed the old school into a multi-purpose community building where social activities and community support are delivered.  The building houses a shop and café.  UEDG members are committed to helping the isolated community at Eskdalemuir become more self-reliant and to reverse the decline that has led to the closure of local services. This in turn is expected to make the area more attractive to investors and families.

The UEDG vision is to create a dynamic hub of activity, where community support, social enterprise, businesses and training can be delivered, and cultural activities can flourish, in a place that will inspire residents and visitors alike.

The UEDG mission is to facilitate the development of a community-led regeneration of rural life by increasing access to regular, high quality services and social activities, as well as opportunities for learning through participation in cultural events and community education.  UEDG would like to see services becoming increasingly localised, provided where possible by the community through social enterprise.

It is considered that this is particularly important in the context of the ageing population.  As people get older and the cost of available travel increases, living in our remote rural communities can mean missing out on things others take for granted.

The Community Hub will become a "green" state of the art location for the delivery of a range of basic, but highly valued, services; community and family events; courses and seminars; arts and cultural events; tourist information and resources for visitors, and a focal point for the growth of new ventures and social enterprise.

Samye Ling Tibetan Buddhist monastery
In the community is the Samye Ling Tibetan Buddhist monastery, which incorporates a former hunting lodge called Johnstone House. Listed as a tourist attraction by VisitScotland , the centre attracts visitors who come simply to see a spectacular gilded temple, stupas and gardens with statues of Bodhisattvas and Buddhas.

Archaeology
Eskdalemuir is rich in archaeological remains, including two neolithic stone circles, the Loupin Stanes and the Girdle Stanes, and bank barrow, Castle O'er, a possible ritual centre for the Selgovae, Raeburnfoot, a Roman fort and later dark age fortifications and settlements.

Climate
Due to the establishment of the Eskdalemuir Observatory here in 1908, Eskdalemuir has one of the longest climatological records in the UK, with data stretching back over 100 years. The data shows Eskdalemuir to be a very wet, often cloudy place.

Eskdalemuir holds the UK weather record for the highest rainfall in a 30-minute period: , recorded on 26 June 1953. It also holds the record for the dullest summer month; 43.9 hours were recorded in August 1912, and subsequently just 41 hours were measured in August 2008. However, these values are not directly comparable due to a change in recording technique – the earlier having been made using a Campbell–Stokes recorder and the later using an electronic recorder.

Other recent low sunshine records for the site include 30 hours during October 2011,  46 hours during September 2008, and 69 hours during July 2010.
Its dullest month was December 2015 with only 9.2 hours recorded. Eskdalemuir experienced its wettest year on record in 2011.

In spite of it being located inland, the dull and wet nature of the climate due to the elevation leads to chilly summers that are colder than more northerly locations such as Glasgow and Edinburgh. The inland nature of the climate is more manifest during winter months with frosts being common, and the average lows between December and February are below the freezing point.

References

External links

 Basic statistics about Eskdalemuir

Villages in Dumfries and Galloway
Parishes in Dumfries and Galloway